Paul William Splittorff Jr. (October 8, 1946 – May 25, 2011) was an American professional baseball player and television sports commentator. After his playing career, Splittorff became a television color commentator for the Royals.

Early years
Splittorff was born in Evansville, Indiana and grew up mostly in Arlington Heights, Illinois. Arlington High School produced several major league baseball players, including Fritz Peterson, Dick Bokelmann, and George Vukovich.

Peterson and Splittorff pitched against each other twice during their careers, with Peterson winning both matchups.  On August 17, 1971, the Yankees beat the Kansas City Royals 2-0 at Yankee Stadium (in the days before the designated hitter, both pitchers went 0-2 at the plate), and on August 22, 1975 at the old Royals Stadium, the Indians beat the Royals, 9-5.

He was drafted by the Royals in the 25th round of the 1968 Major League Baseball Draft out of Morningside College in Sioux City, Iowa, where he was a member of Delta Sigma Phi fraternity and also played basketball. He pitched for the Corning Royals in 1968 (a year before the major league club existed), and has the distinction of throwing the first pitch in Royals organization history.  He went 28–27 with a 4.01 earned run average in three seasons in the Royals' farm system before receiving his first call to the majors in September . He took the loss in his major league debut, pitching seven innings and giving up three earned runs against the Chicago White Sox.

Kansas City Royals
Splittorff began the  season with the Omaha Royals, but after going 5–2 with a 1.48 ERA in eight starts for Omaha, he earned a second promotion to the majors. He stayed with Kansas City for the rest of the season, going 8–9 with a 2.68 ERA.

From there, he became a fixture in the Kansas City rotation. Splittorff was the starting pitcher in the inaugural game at Kauffman Stadium (known at the time as Royals Stadium) on April 10, 1973; Splittorff earned the victory that evening in a 12–1 rout of the Texas Rangers.

For his part, Splittorff was 2–0 with a 2.84 ERA against the Yankees in the five appearances he made against them in the ALCS. Kansas City swept the series, with Splittorff starting the third and deciding game, and receiving a no-decision. The Royals lost the World Series in six games to the Philadelphia Phillies with Splittorff making his only appearance in game six.

Never an All-Star and usually overshadowed by teammates Steve Busby, Dennis Leonard and Larry Gura, Splittorff's consistency and longevity resulted in his winning more games than any of them. Splittorff accumulated 166 career victories over a 15-year career with the Royals. Primarily a starter, Splittorff did pick up one save during his career. On July 22, 1975, in the first game of a doubleheader, he saved a 3-2 Royals victory over the Brewers. Splittorff pitched  scoreless innings to hold down the victory for Steve Busby.

Splittorff retired when his effectiveness faded. At the same time, the Royals had numerous young pitchers coming through the ranks. His final game was on June 26, .

Personal life
After his retirement, Splittorff became a television color commentator for the Royals. He also worked as an analyst for Big Eight and Big 12 college basketball telecasts.

On May 16, 2011, Splittorff's battle with oral cancer and melanoma became public. Nine days later, on the morning of May 25, he died in his Blue Springs, Missouri, home at the age of 64.

See also
List of Major League Baseball players who spent their entire career with one franchise

References

1976 Baseball Register published by The Sporting News

External links

1946 births
2011 deaths
Methodists from Illinois
Baseball players from Indiana
Deaths from cancer in Missouri
College basketball announcers in the United States
Corning Royals players
Deaths from oral cancer
Deaths from melanoma
Kansas City Royals announcers
Kansas City Royals players
Major League Baseball broadcasters
Major League Baseball pitchers
Morningside Mustangs baseball players
Morningside Mustangs men's basketball players
Omaha Royals players
Sportspeople from Evansville, Indiana
Pan American Games medalists in baseball
Pan American Games gold medalists for the United States
People from Blue Springs, Missouri
Baseball players at the 1967 Pan American Games
Medalists at the 1967 Pan American Games
Methodists from Indiana